The Iron Block Building, so named for the words Iron Block embossed high on its front facade is an historic two-story 
commercial building located at 530 12th Street West (Old Main Street) across from the Manatee County Courthouse in Bradenton, Manatee County, Florida. The Iron Block Building was built in 1896 in the cast iron style of architecture by Dr. Charles Ballard. It originally housed Reed's Cash Store. The building would be moved from its original location at the southwest corner of Manatee Avenue and 12th Street West to its present location in 1921. It has been restored and according to A Guide to Florida's Historic Architecture features original "pressed metal facades on three sides."

In 1989, the Iron Block Building was listed in A Guide to Florida's Historic Architecture, published by the University of Florida Press." Today it houses professional offices and retail businesses.

References

Cast-iron architecture in the United States
Commercial buildings in Florida
Commercial buildings completed in 1896
Buildings and structures in Manatee County, Florida
1896 establishments in Florida